Acronychia vestita, commonly known as white aspen, lemon aspen, hairy aspen or fuzzy lemon aspen, is a species of rainforest tree that is endemic to Queensland. It has simple, elliptic to egg-shaped leaves with the narrower end towards the base, flowers arranged in relatively large groups, mostly in leaf axils and fleshy, pear-shaped to more or less spherical fruit.

Description

Taxonomy
Acronychia vestita was first formally described in 1864 by Ferdinand von Mueller in Fragmenta phytographiae Australiae.

Distribution and habitat

Conservation status
This species is classified as of "least concern" under the Queensland Government Nature Conservation Act 1992.

References

vestita
Flora of Queensland
Plants described in 1864
Taxa named by Ferdinand von Mueller